The four teams in this group played against each other on a home-and-away basis. The winner (France) qualified for the 1966 FIFA World Cup in England.

Matches

 

 

 

 

 

 

 

 

 

 

 

France qualified.

Final table

Team stats

Head coach:  Henri Guérin

Head coach:  Ragnar Larsen

Head coach:  Ljubomir Lovrić (first match);  Aleksandar Tirnanić (second to sixth match)

Head coach:  Robert Heinz

External links
FIFA official page
RSSSF - 1966 World Cup Qualification
Allworldcup

3
1964–65 in French football
qual
1964–65 in Yugoslav football
1965–66 in Yugoslav football
1964 in Norwegian football
1965 in Norwegian football
1966 in Norwegian football
1964–65 in Luxembourgian football
1965–66 in Luxembourgian football